The first season of the sitcom Family Matters originally aired on ABC from September 22, 1989 to April 27, 1990.

Premise
In the first season, following the death of her husband, Robert, Rachel moves in to the Winslow household with her son, Richie. The house is occupied by Carl, Rachel's brother-in-law, Harriette, Rachel's sister, Estelle, Carl's mother, Edward (Eddie), Laura and Judy. The first appearance of Steve Urkel is in episode four (syndication only).  In episode 12, it is revealed to the audience that he's in love with Laura.

Main cast 

 Reginald VelJohnson as Carl Winslow
 Jo Marie Payton as Harriette Winslow
 Rosetta LeNoire as Estelle Winslow
 Darius McCrary as Eddie Winslow
 Kellie Shanygne Williams as Laura Winslow
 Valerie Jones (this pilot only) and Jaimee Foxworth as Judy Winslow
 Joseph and Julius Wright as Richie Crawford
 Telma Hopkins as Rachel Crawford

Recurring cast 
 Jaleel White as Steve Urkel (Credited as "Guest Starring": episodes 12-17, 19-20. Credited as "Also Starring": episodes 4, 7, 8, 10, 18, 21-22.)

Episodes

See also 
 List of Family Matters episodes

References 

 

1989 American television seasons
1990 American television seasons